The Ladies of the Orient (L.O.T.O.) is a women's fraternal organization in the United States and Canada which had its origins as an appendant body to the Rebekahs. The first unit, Pioneer Zuanna No. 1 was founded in Syracuse, New York in 1915 by Emily Voorheis for the purpose of having a group dedicated to recreation and amusement as a pleasant diversion from the serious charitable work done by other groups to which the ladies already belonged. It was first incorporated in New York in 1921 under the name "Supreme Royal Zuanna of the Mystic Degrees of Persecution and Purification Ladies of the Orient of United States and Canada". While it has a close relationship with the Odd Fellows appendant body known as the Ancient Mystic Order of Samaritans, it is not a true women’s auxiliary, but rather an independent organization founded entirely by women and requiring no affiliation with its men’s counterpart. Local units of LOTO are referred to as "zuannas" and are presided over by a "Great Ashayhi." The basic regalia of the group is a white fez with a "Z" inside a triangle and crescent bearing a yellow tassel, though there are more advanced fez and tassel colors for higher-ranked members, such as a white fez with a purple tassel for Past Ashayhis. As with AMOS, the group has a particular charitable focus on Cognitive disabilities.

References 

Independent Order of Odd Fellows
Organizations established in 1915
1915 establishments in the United States